Darah is a village in Khyber-Pakhtunkhwa province of Pakistan. It is located at 34°7'40N 73°10'45E with an altitude of 1217 metres (3996 feet). Neighbouring settlements include Batangi, Biba Dhaka, and Tingur.

References

Villages in Khyber Pakhtunkhwa